Universidad del Pacífico may refer to:
 Universidad del Pacífico
 Universidad del Pacífico
 Universidad del Pacífico : Escuela de Negocios
 Universidad del Pacífico
 Universidad del Pacífico